Krathis is a river in the eastern part of Achaea, southern Greece. The river flows through the municipal unit of Akrata.

Geography
The river's course is from the south to the north. It begins in the northern part of the Chelmos mountains and flows through a deep valley. It passes the village Tsivlos and the town Akrata. The river empties into the Gulf of Corinth near Akrata.

History
In ancient times the river's course was close to Achaean Aegae and had two tributaries according to Strabo. The river received its name because it was a mixture. Pausanias and Herodotus also mention it, stating that the river Crathis in Bruttium was named after it.

References

Landforms of Achaea
Akrata
Rivers of Greece
Rivers of Western Greece
Drainage basins of the Gulf of Corinth